Psyri or Psiri or Psyrri or Psirri ( or Ψυρρή) is a gentrified neighbourhood in Athens, Greece, today known for its restaurants, bars, live music tavernas, and small number of hotels.

Description
Until the early 1990s, Psyri, one of the oldest quarters of Athens, had an ill reputation, but it has now become one of the most fashionable and trendy choices in the centre of Athens for accommodation, entertainment and food hospitality.

The central square of Psyri is called "Heroes square" (πλατεία Ηρώων, plateia Iroon), because the streets leading to it carry names of heroes of the Greek War of Independence (e.g. Karaiskakis, Miaoulis). In the era of the 'old Athens' (namely, during the last quarter of the 19th century), the nickname "plateia of Heroes" was a derisive reference to koutsavakides (κουτσαβάκηδες), who used it as their hangout.

History
Lord Byron was accommodated in the neighbourhood during his stay in Athens and here is where he wrote the poem "Maid of Athens". The most famous Greek inhabitant of Psyri was Alexandros Papadiamantis who lived in the area for more than two decades.

Notes

References
 Καιροφύλας, Γιάννης. Η ιστορία της συνοικίας του Ψυρή, ed. Φιλιππότη, Athens, 2000 
 Στασινόπουλος, Επαμεινώνδας. Η Αθήνα του περασμένου αιώνα (1830-1900), Athens, 1963 
 Μπίρης, Κωνσταντίνος. Αι τοπωνυμίαι της πόλεως και των περιχώρων των Αθηνών, ed. Υπουργείο Πολιτισμού:Ταμείο Αρχαιολογικών Πόρων και Απαλλοτριώσεων, 2006 (reprint of the 1971 edition) 

Tourist attractions in Athens
Neighbourhoods in Athens